Hanestad is a village in Rendalen Municipality in Innlandet county, Norway. The Norwegian National Road 3 runs through the village. The Rørosbanen railway line also runs through the village, stopping at Hanestad Station, the only railroad station in Rendalen. In 2021, the village had 40 residents.

In Hanestad there is a gas station/service center, an inn, Hanestad Station, and Hanestad Church.

References

External links
Hanestad - The Pearl Of Østerdalen
Hanestad in Østerdalen

Rendalen
Villages in Innlandet